Guus Lutjens (13 August 1884 – 25 April 1974) was a Dutch footballer who earned 14 caps for the Dutch national side between 1905 and 1911, scoring five goals.  He played club football for amateur side HVV Den Haag.

References

External links
 Player profile at KNVB
 Player profile at VoetbalStats.nl

1884 births
1974 deaths
Dutch footballers
Netherlands international footballers
Footballers from Arnhem
Association football forwards